The Jogi  (also spelled Jugi or Yogi) is  a Hindu community found in North India and considered among the most spiritual and holy castes in Hindu religion. Jogi surname is associated with the ancient migrants of the southern Indian states Karnataka, Andhra Pradesh, Tamil Nadu, and Kerala and Gujarat. They are collectively known as Nath, Jogi Nath, Jugi Nath, Nath Jogi, Haral, Rawal and Rawal Dev Jogi in Gujarat state.

The word 'Jogi' is derived from the Sanskrit word "yoga", and there is a description of caste and its origin mentioned in Shiva Purana. It is a colloquial term for the word Yogi that refers to the people who practised Yoga as part of their daily rituals. Over time, this led to the formation of this community and subsequent castes.

History
 They are Hindu by religion and have been claimed to have sacred thread on their body. They have been claimed to be descendants of the mendicants of India called Jogi as Sadhus and rishi.

Classification
Jogis are classified as Other Backward Classes in most of India's States and UTs, namely Assam, Rajasthan, Delhi, Uttarakhand, Uttar Pradesh, West Bengal, Madhya Pradesh and Scheduled Caste in the state of Himachal Pradesh.

References

See also
Jangam Lingayats

Social groups of Uttar Pradesh
Indian castes
Social groups of Madhya Pradesh
Social groups of Haryana
Social groups of Bihar
Social groups of Karnataka
Tuluva
Other Backward Classes
Social groups of Rajasthan